"I Got Stripes" is a song recorded by Johnny Cash.

The Cash's version is credited to him and Charlie Williams, but they borrowed from a song by Lead Belly titled "On a Monday". 

Lead Belly's original, also known as "Yellow Women's Door Bells" and "Almost Done", was recorded and released by him in 1939 and reflected his "prison experiences".

Johnny Cash version 
The song was recorded by Cash on March 12, 1959 and released as a single in July, with "Five Feet High and Rising" (another song from the same recording session) on the opposite side.

According to Robert Hilburn and his book Johnny Cash: The Life, "I Got Stripes" is a "raucous prison tale" written by Johnny Cash and Charlie Williams, a DJ from Los Angeles and Cash's friend. They borrowed from a song by Lead Belly titled "On a Monday".

Charts

References 

Lead Belly songs
Johnny Cash songs
1959 songs
1959 singles
Songs written by Johnny Cash
Columbia Records singles
Songs about prison